Çukurbağ is a  village in Tarsus district of Mersin Province, Turkey. It is situated in the Taurus Mountains to the east of Turkish motor way . The population of village was 333 as of 2012.

References

Villages in Tarsus District